The Loren Nunataks are a line of low nunataks standing  east of the Rivas Peaks in the Neptune Range of the Pensacola Mountains, Antarctica. They were mapped by the United States Geological Survey from surveys and U.S. Navy air photos, 1956–66, and were named by the Advisory Committee on Antarctic Names for Loren Brown, Jr., an aviation machinist at Ellsworth Station, winter 1958.

References

Nunataks of Queen Elizabeth Land